Kalkal or Kal Kal or Kol Kol may refer to:
 Kol Kol, Kermanshah
 Kalkal, Khuzestan

See also
 Kol Kol (disambiguation)